Salyersville National Bank is a small community bank in Magoffin County, Kentucky. The bank originally operated out of offices located at the junction of Maple and North Church streets in Salyersville.  Still in existence, this building is used by Salyersville Renaissance, a Main Street Program.

History
The Salyersville National bank was chartered a national bank in 1902 by George Carpenter.

Salyersville Bank building was added to the National Register of Historic Places on November 7, 1997.

References

External links
Salyersville National Bank website
Salyersville Renaissance website

Commercial buildings completed in 1912
Banks based in Kentucky
National Register of Historic Places in Magoffin County, Kentucky
Banks established in 1902
Bank buildings on the National Register of Historic Places in Kentucky
1902 establishments in Kentucky
Salyersville, Kentucky
Beaux-Arts architecture in Kentucky